Louis Shih Tai Cho (born 1952 in Hong Kong) is a Chinese dermatologist in Hong Kong and deputy chairman of pro-Beijing New People's Party.

Shih grew up on a public housing estate in Kwun Tong, Kowloon. He graduated from La Salle College and the MBBS of the University of Hong Kong. He emigrated to Canada in the early 1980s, but returned to Hong Kong in 1995. He is now married with three children.

Shih was the chairman of SynergyNet, a policy thinktank in the Hong Kong pro-democracy camp. But he crossed the floor to support Regina Ip, the former Secretary for Security of the Hong Kong SAR and a pro-Beijing politician, to participate in the 2007 Hong Kong Island by-election. The following year, he stood in the legislative elections with Ip for the Hong Kong Island seats, but lost.

References

External links
Official website of Regina and Louis' Election Team

1952 births
Living people
Hong Kong medical doctors
Alumni of the University of Hong Kong
Chinese dermatologists
New People's Party (Hong Kong) politicians
Members of the Election Committee of Hong Kong, 2007–2012
Members of the Election Committee of Hong Kong, 2012–2017
20th-century Chinese physicians
21st-century Chinese physicians